Sha Ha is a village in Sai Kung District, Hong Kong.

Administration
Sha Ha is a recognized village under the New Territories Small House Policy.

References

External links

 Delineation of area of existing village Sha Ha (Sai Kung) for election of resident representative (2019 to 2022)

Villages in Sai Kung District, Hong Kong